Manuel Schmid (born 9 February 1993) is a German World Cup alpine ski racer, specializing in Super-G.

He participated in the FIS Alpine World Ski Championships 2019. He is older brother of Alexander Schmid.

World Championship results

References

External links

1993 births
Living people
German male alpine skiers
21st-century German people